This is a list of the catholicoi of all Armenians, head bishops of the Armenian Apostolic Church. To this day 21 Catholicoi of a total of 132 have been glorified within the church.

Catholicoi of Armenia
(Name in English, dates, Armenian name in Eastern Armenian spelling)

Apostolic Era

Sophene Era

First Echmiadzin era (301–452)
Arsacid Dynasty (from 301 to 428 the episcopal office is hereditary)
St. Gregory I the Illuminator (301–325) -- Սուրբ Գրիգոր Ա Պարթև (Լուսավորիչ) 
St. Aristaces I (325–333) -- Սբ. Արիստակես Ա Պարթև
St. Vrtanes I (333–341) -- Սբ. Վրթանես Ա Պարթև 
St. Husik I (341–347) -- Սբ. Հուսիկ Ա Պարթև 
Assyrian descent
Daniel I of Armenia (347) -- Դանիել Ա
Ashishatts Dynasty
Pharen I of Armenia (348–352) -- Փառեն Ա Աշտիշատցի 
Arsacid Dynasty
St. Nerses I the Great (353–373) -- Սուրբ Ներսես Ա Մեծ (Պարթև)
Albaniosid Dynasty
Sahak I (373–377) -- Սահակ Ա Մանազկերտցի 
Zaven I (377–381) -- Զավեն Ա Մանազկերտցի
Aspuraces I (381–386) -- Ասպուրակես Ա Մանազկերտցի 
Arsacid Dynasty
St. Sahak I (387–428) -- Սբ. Սահակ Ա Պարթև 
Assyrian descent
Brkisho of Armenia (428–432) -- Բրկիշո
Samuel of Armenia (432–437) -- Սամվել
Non-Hereditary Bishop
St. Hovsep I (437–452) -- Սբ. Հովսեփ Ա Հողոցմեցի

Dvin era (452–927)
Melitus I (452–456) -- Մելիտե Ա Մանազկերտցի
Moses I (456–461) -- Մովսես Ա Մանազկերտցի
St. Kyud I (461–478) -- Սբ. Գյուտ Ա Արահեզացի 
St. John I (478–490) -- Սբ. Հովհաննես Ա Մանդակունի 
Babken I (490–516) -- Բաբկեն Ա Ոթմսեցի 
Samuel I (516–526) -- Սամվել Ա Արծկեցի 
Mushe I (526–534) -- Մուշե Ա Այլաբերցի
Sahak II (534–539) -- Սահակ Բ Ուղկեցի 
Christopher I (539–545) -- Քրիստափոր Ա Տիրառիջցի 
Ghevond I (545–548) -- Ղեվոնդ Ա Եռաստեցի 
Nerses II (548–557) -- Ներսես Բ Բագրևվանդցի 
John II (557–574)-- Հովհաննես Բ Գաբեղենցի
Moses II (574–604) -- Մովսես Բ. Եղիվարդեցի 
vacant 604–607, administered by Verthanes Qerthol the Grammatic
Abraham I (607–615) -- Աբրահամ Ա Աղբաթանեցի 
Komitas I (615–628) -- Կոմիտաս Ա Աղցեցի 
Christopher II (628–630), died aft. 630 — Քրիստափոր Բ Ապահունի 
Ezra I (630–641) -- Եզր Ա Փառաժնակերտցի 
Nerses III the Builder (641–661) -- Ներսես Գ Տայեցի (Շինարար) 
Anastasius I (661–667) -- Անաստաց Ա Ակոռեցի 
Israel I (667–677) -- Իսրայել Ա Ոթմսեցի
Sahak III (677–703) -- Սահակ Գ. Ձորոփորեցի
Elias I (703–717) -- Եղիա Ա Արճիզեցի 
St. John III the Philosopher (717–728) -- Սբ. Հովհաննես Գ Օձնեցի (Փիլիսոփա) 
David I (728–741) -- Դավիթ Ա Արամոնեցի 
Dertad I (741–764) -- Տրդատ Ա Ոթմսեցի 
Dertad II (764–767) -- Տրդատ Բ Դասնավորեցի 
Sion I (767–775) -- Սիոն Ա Բավոնեցի 
Isaiah I (775–788) -- Եսայի Ա Եղիպատրուշեցի
Stephen I (788–790) -- Ստեփանոս Ա Դվնեցի
Joab I (790–791) -- Յովաբ Ա Դվնեցի
Solomon I (791–792) -- Սողոմոն Ա Գառնեցի 
George I (792–795) -- Գևորգ Ա Բյուրականցի 
Joseph I (795–806) -- Հովսեփ Բ Փարպեցի 
David II (806–833) -- Դավիթ Բ Կակաղեցի
John IV (833–855) -- Հովհաննես Դ Ավայեցի 
Zacharias I (855–876) -- Զաքարիա Ա Ձագեցի 
George II (877–897) -- Գևորգ Բ Գառնեցի 
Mashdotz I (897–898) -- Մաշտոց Ա Եղվարդեցի

Aghtamar era (927–947)
John V the Historian (898–929) -- Հովհաննես Ե Դրասխանակերտցի 
Stephen II (929–930) -- Ստեփանոս Բ Ռշտունի 
Theodore I (930–941) -- Թեոդորոս Ա Ռշտունի 
Yeghishe I (941–946) -- Եղիշե Ա Ռշտունի

Arghina era (947–992)
Ananias I (949–968) -- Անանիա Ա Մոկացի
Vahan I (968–969) -- Վահան Ա Սյունեցի 
Stephen III (969–972) -- Ստեփանոս Գ Սևանցի 
Khachig I (973–992) -- Խաչիկ Ա Արշարունի

Ani era (992–1058)
Sarkis I (992–1019), d. aft. 1019 — Սարգիս Ա Սևանցի
Peter I (1019–1058) -- Պետրոս Ա Գետադարձ

During this time the see was transferred to Cilicia, from 1058 until 1441 (see List of Armenian Catholicoi of Cilicia for continued succession).

Catholicoi of the Mother See of Holy Echmiadzin and All Armenians

Second Echmiadzin era (1441–present)
Giragos I (1441–1443) -- Կիրակոս Ա Վիրապեցի
Gregory X (1443–1465) -- Գրիգոր Ժ Ջալալբեկյանց 
Aristaces II (Coadjutor) (1465–1469) -- Արիստակես Բ Աթոռակալ 
Sarkis II the Relic-Carrier (1469–1474) -- Սարգիս Բ Աջատար 
John VII the Relic-Bearer (1474–1484), d. 1506—Հովհաննես Է Աջակիր 
Sarkis III the Other (1484–1515) -- Սարգիս Գ Մյուսայլ 
Zacharias II (1515–1520) -- Զաքարիա Բ Վաղարշապատցի 
Sarkis IV (1520–1536) -- Սարգիս Դ Վրաստանցի 
Gregory XI (1536–1545) -- Գրիգոր ԺԱ Բյուզանդացի 
Stepanos V (1545–1567) -- Ստեփանոս Ե Սալմաստեցի 
Michael I (1567–1576) -- Միքայել Ա Սեբաստացի
Gregory XII (1576–1590) -- Գրիգոր ԺԲ Վաղարշապատցի 
David IV (1590–1629), d. 1633—Դավիթ Դ Վաղարշապատցի
Moses III (1629–1632) -- Մովսես Գ Տաթևացի
Philip I (1633–1655) -- Փիլիպոս Ա Աղբակեցի 
Jacob IV (1655–1680) -- Հակոբ Դ Ջուղայեցի 
Eliazar I (1681–1691) -- Եղիազար Ա Այնթափցի 
Nahabed I (1691–1705) -- Նահապետ Ա Եդեսացի 
Alexander I (1706–1714) -- Ալեքսանդր Ա Ջուղայեցի 
Asdvadzadur (1715–1725) -- Աստվածատուր Ա Համադանցի
Karapet II (1726–1729) -- Կարապետ Բ Ուլնեցի 
Abraham II (1730–1734) -- Աբրահամ Բ Խոշաբեցի 
Abraham III (1734–1737) -- Աբրահամ Գ Կրետացի 
Lazar I (1737–1751) -- Ղազար Ա Ջահկեցի 
Minas I (1751–1753) -- Մինաս Ա Ակնեցի 
Alexander II (1753–1755) -- Ալեքսանդր Բ Բյուզանդացի 
Sahak V (elected but never consecrated) (1755) -- Սահակ Ե 
vacant (1755–1759) 
Jacob V (1759–1763) -- Հակոբ Ե Շամախեցի 
Simeon I (1763–1780) -- Սիմոն Ա Երևանցի 
Luke I (1780–1799) -- Ղուկաս Ա Կարնեցի 
Joseph II (elected but never consecrated) (1800), d. 1801 — Հովսեփ Բ
David V (1801–1807) -- Դավիթ Ե Էնեգեթցի (Ղորղանյան) 
Daniel II (1802–1808) --  Դանիել Բ Սուրմառեցի 
Yeprem I (1809–1830), d. 1835—Եփրեմ Ա Ձորագեղցի 
John VIII (1831–1842) -- Հովհաննես Ը Կարբեցի 
Nerses V (1843–1857) -- Ներսես Ե. Աշտարակեցի 
Matthew I (1858–1865) -- Մատթէոս Ա Կոնստանդնուպոլսեցի (Չուխաճեան) 
George IV (1866–1882) -- Գէորգ Դ Կոնստանդնուպոլսեցի (Քէրեստեճեան) 
vacant (1882–1885) 
Magar (1885–1891) -- Մակար Ա. Թեղուտցի 
Mkrtich I Khrimian (1892–1907) -- Մկրտիչ Ա Վանեցի (Խրիմեան Հայրիկ) 
Matthew II (1908–1910) -- Մատթևոս Բ Կոնստանդնուպոլսեցի (Իզմիրլեան) 
George V (1911–1930) -- Գևորգ Ե Սուրենեանց (Տփղիսեցի) 
vacant (1930–1932) 
Khoren I (1932–1938) -- Խորեն Ա Մուրադբեկեան (Տփղիսեցի) 
vacant (1938–1945) 
George VI (1945–1954) -- Գևորգ Զ Չորեքչյան (Նորնախիջևանցի)
Vazgen I (1955–1994) -- Վազգեն Ա Պալճյան (Բուխարեստցի) 
Karekin I (1994–1999) -- Գարեգին Ա Սարգիսյան (Քեսաբցի) 
Karekin II (1999–present) -- Գարեգին Բ Ներսիսյան (Ոսկեհատցի)

See also
Catholicos of All Armenians
List of Catholicos of the East
List of Armenian Catholicoi of Cilicia
List of Armenian Patriarchs of Constantinople
List of Armenian Patriarchs of Jerusalem
List of Armenian Catholic patriarchs of Cilicia

References 

Religion-related lists

Lists of Oriental Orthodox Christians
Armenia
Armenia religion-related lists
Lists of Armenian people
All Armenians